Port Weller may refer to:
Port Weller, Ontario, a community
Port Weller Dry Docks, a shipbuilder located on the Welland Canal at the Lake Ontario entrance